Andries de Graeff (19 February 1611 – 30 November 1678) was a powerful member of the Amsterdam branch of the De Graeff - family during the Dutch Golden Age. He became a mayor of Amsterdam and a powerful Amsterdam regent after the death of his older brother Cornelis de Graeff. Like him and their father Jacob Dircksz de Graeff he opposed the house of Orange. In the mid-17th century, during the First Stadtholderless Period, they controlled the finances and politics.

Andries de Graeff followed in his father's and brother's footsteps and, between 1657 and 1672, was appointed mayor some seven times. He was a member of a family of regents who belonged to the republican political movement also referred to as the ‘state oriented’, the Dutch States Party, as opposed to the Royalists. Andries was called the last mayor from the dynasty of the "Graven", who was powerful and able enough to ruled the city of Amsterdam.

De Graeff was an Imperial Knight of the Holy Roman Empire,  an Ambachtsheer (Lord of the manor) from Urk en Emmeloord, during the late 1650s chiefcouncillor of the Admiralty of Amsterdam, chieflandholder of the Watergraafsmeer and dijkgraaf van Nieuwer-Amstel.

Together with his brother Cornelis De Graeff he became an illustrious Patron and Art collector.

Family De Graeff

Origin 

Andries de Graeff was born in  Amsterdam, the third son of Jacob Dircksz de Graeff and Aaltje Boelens Loen. His family was in the circle of the Amsterdam oligarchy of the Golden Age. His older sister Agneta de Graeff van Polsbroek married Jan Bicker. The couple had two children, Wendela Bicker and Jacoba Bicker; Wendela married to Johan de Witt and Jacoba to De Graeffs nephew Pieter de Graeff. His close relatives included also Holland's great writer Pieter Corneliszoon Hooft, the influential Amsterdam mayors Andries, Cornelis, Jan Bicker, and Frans Banning Cocq, who was his brother in law.

Marriage 
 
After Andries de Graeff has been finished his study in Poitiers he was married to his full niece Elisabeth Bicker van Swieten (1623-1656), daughter of his uncle Cornelis Bicker van Swieten. Through his marriage he became a Cousin-in-law of Joachim Irgens von Westervick. The couple had four children:
 Cornelis de Graeff (1650–1678) m. Agneta Deutz
 Alida de Graeff(1 651–1738), m. Diederik van Veldhuyzen (1651–1716)
 Arnoldina de Graeff (1652–1703) m. Transisalanus Adolphus Baron van Voorst tot Hagenvoorde, son of Hidde van Voorst and Joanna van Haersolte tot Staverden en Bredenhorst, vrouwe van Staverden Bredenhorst en Zwaluwenberg (†1720), herself a daughter of Simon van Haersolte (1610-1673) and Adriana Josina Bentinck (ca 1620-ca 1685)
 Jacob de Graeff, died at early age

Andries de Graeff was also tempted to marry off his children to people from different circles. The marriages of his daughters, especially Arnoldina's with Baron Van Voorst, showed a conscious rapprochement with the Orangism camp in the republic even after his political end. Andries de Graeff was probably not as anti-Orangist as his politics would suggest.

Von Graben connection 

Before De Graeff died, he and his only son, Cornelis, became knights of the Holy Roman Empire. They said, that they descent from Wolfgang von Graben, member of the Austrian noble family Von Graben, which was an apparent (or illegitimate) branch of the House of Meinhardin. That diplome dadet from 19 July 1677. Diplom loaned to Mr. Andries de Graeff, July, 19th 1677:
 "Fide digis itegur genealogistarum Amsteldamensium edocti testimoniis te Andream de Graeff [Andries de Graeff] non paternum solum ex pervetusta in Comitatu nostro Tyrolensi von Graben dicta familia originem ducere, qua olim per quendam ex ascendentibus tuis ejus nominis in Belgium traducta et in Petrum de Graeff [Pieter Graeff], abavum, Johannem [Jan Pietersz Graeff], proavum, Theodorum [Dirck Jansz Graeff], avum, ac tandem Jacobum [Jacob Dircksz de Graeff], patrem tuum, viros in civitate, Amstelodamensi continua serie consulatum scabinatus senatorii ordinis dignitabitus conspicuos et in publicum bene semper meritos propagata nobiliter et cum splendore inter suos se semper gessaerit interque alios honores praerogativasque nobilibus eo locorum proprias liberum venandi jus in Hollandia, Frisiaque occidentale ac Ultrajectina provinciis habuerit semper et exercuerit."

Feudality 

In 1627/1636 Andries de Graeff inherited the manor Vredenhof (Voorschoten) from both his uncle Jan Dircksz Graeff (?–1627) and his Jacob Dircksz de Graeff. There he had the manorial right to breed swans.

He also bought large plots of land in the Oud-Naarden (Naarden) area and thus built his country estate Graeffenveld. He had a hill built there, the Venusberg, on the top of which a lion statue was erected, and which was then called Leeuwenberg.

In 1660 De Graeff received the Lordship of Urk and Emmeloord from the States of Holland for the city of Amsterdam. Oddly enough, he received the fief as a heritage fief (tot eenen erfleenen binnen after zusters kindt, niet te versterven, ende althoos te commen op den oudsten ende naesten, alzoo wel van manhooft als van wijfhoofde). He held this administration until the Rampjaar 1672.

Coat of arms 
The coat of arms of Andries de Graeff is quartered and shows the following symbols:
 field 1 (left above) shows the silver shovel on red of their paternal ancestors, the Herren von Graben
 field 2 (right above) shows the silver swan on blue of the Fief Vredenhof
 field 3 (left below), same as field 2
 field 4 (right below), same as field 1
 helmet covers in red and silver
 helm adornment shows an upright silver spade with ostrich feathers (Herren von Graben)
 motto: MORS SCEPTRA LIGONIBUS AEQUAT (DEATH MAKES SEPTRES AND HOES EQUAL)

Genealogical and political Legacy 

Andries' brother Cornelis de Graeff said that the ancient Amsterdammers had no habit of keeping genealogical records of their families, and knew no more of their generation than what they have learned from their fathers and grandfathers. The dates of his own family in Amsterdam do not go back very far:

And first I'll start with the family de Graven from which I descended on my father's side. This is a family from Amsterdam, coming from the house 'de Keijser', that was located at the Waeter (= now Damrak No. 91). This house shows the impression of its vaulted appearance, owned by Jan Pieters de Graeff, and then by Dirck Jans de Graeff, who also sold this house. My father Jacob de Graeff and his brothers were also born here.

The De Graeff family has therefore never boasted about the age of their own family in Amsterdam. But Andries and his brother Cornelis de Graeff together with their cousins Andries and Cornelis Bicker, saw themselves as the political heirs of the old regent family Boelens, whose main lineage, which had remained catholic, had died out in the male line in 1647. They had received the very significant first names Andries and Cornelis from their Boelens ancestors. As in a real dynasty, members of the two families frequently intermarried in the 17th century in order to keep their political and commercial capital together. Its great historical ancestor was Andries Boelens (1455-1519), the city's most influential medieval mayor. Both families, Bicker and De Graeff, descend in the female line from Boelens. He was allowed to hold the highest office in Amsterdam fifteen times.

Politics

Influence 
Both brothers Andries and Cornelis de Graeff were very critical of the Orange family’s influence. Together with the Republican political leader Grand Pensionary Johan de Witt, the De Graeff brothers strived for the abolition of stadtholdership. They desired the full sovereignty of the individual regions in a form in which the Republic of the United Seven Netherlands was not ruled by a single person. Instead of a sovereign (or stadtholder) the political and military power was lodged with the States General and with the regents of the cities in Holland.

During the two decades the De Graeff family had a leading role in the Amsterdam administration, the city was at the peak of its political power. This period was also referred to by Republicans as the ‘Ware Vrijheid’ (True Freedom). It was the First Stadtholderless Period which lasted from 1650 to 1672. During these twenty years, the regents from Holland and in particular those of Amsterdam, controlled the republic. The city was flush with self-confidence and liked to compare itself to the famous Republic of Rome. Even without a stadtholder, things seemed to be going well for the Republic and its regents both politically and economically.

Career 

Andries de Graeff was from 1646 a member of the vroedschap and from 1657-71 mayor seven times in the difficult times of the First Stadtholderless Period. Between 1650 and 1657 he was advisor of finances and finance minister of Holland at The Hague.

Like his brother Cornelis, their cousin Andries Bicker and Joan Huydecoper van Maarsseveen De Graeff became one of the main figures behind the building of a new city hall on the Dam, which was inaugurated in 1655.

In 1650 he started his career as advisor at the Court of Audit of Holland and West-Friesland (Grafelijke rekenkammer van het domeinen van Holland en West-Friesland) at The Hague. After he became Statutory auditor (Rekenmeester der Grafelijke domeinen van Holland en West-Friesland) there he went back to Amsterdam, and took place as a sort of chairing mayor of this city. After the death of his brother Cornelis, De Graeff became the strong leader of the republicans. He held this position until the rampjaar.
He also became an advisor of the Admiralty of Amsterdam and in 1661 he was made an advisor of the States of Holland and West Friesland.

The Dutch Gift 
In 1660 the Dutch Gift was organized by the regents, especially Andries and his brother Cornelis. The sculptures for the gift were selected by the pre-eminent sculptor in the Netherlands, Artus Quellinus, and Gerrit van Uylenburgh, the son of Rembrandt's dealer Hendrick van Uylenburgh, advised the States-General on the purchase. The Dutch Gift was a collection of 28 mostly Italian Renaissance paintings and 12 classical sculptures, along with a yacht, the Mary, and furniture, which was presented to King Charles II of England by the States-General of the Netherlands in 1660.

Most of the paintings and all the Roman sculptures were from the Reynst collection, the most important seventeenth-century Dutch collection of paintings of the Italian sixteenth century, formed in Venice by Jan Reynst (1601–1646) and extended by his brother, Gerrit Reynst (1599–1658).

The collection was given to Charles II to mark his return to power in the English Restoration, before which Charles had spent many years in exile in the Dutch Republic during the rule of the English Commonwealth. It was intended to strengthen diplomatic relations between England and the Republic, but only a few years after the gift the two nations would be at war again in the Second Anglo-Dutch War of 1665–67.

Perpetual Edict (1667) and the Rampjaar 1672 

In 1667 De Graeff was one of the "sponsors" (the other signers where De Witt, Gillis Valckenier and Gaspar Fagel) of the Perpetual Edict, that was a resolution of the States of Holland in which they abolished the office of Stadtholder in the province of Holland. At approximately the same time a majority of provinces in the States-General of the Netherlands agreed to declare the office of stadtholder (in any of the provinces) incompatible with the office of Captain general of the Dutch Republic.

The Republic was in a dangerous position and war with France and England seemed imminent. The call for the return of a strong military leader from the Orange family was gaining momentum, particularly among commoners. A number of Amsterdam regents had started to realise that they needed to seek rapprochement with the Orangists. This put increasing pressure on Grand Pensionary Johan de Witts position. In 1670, the Amsterdamse Vroedschap (Amsterdam City Council) led by Mayors Valckenier and Coenraad van Beuningen decided to enter into an alliance with the Orangists and to offer the young prince William III of Orange a seat on the Council of State. This caused a definitive split between De Witt and the Orangist Amsterdam Group of regents around Mayor Valckenier. However, De Witt managed to push the turncoats into the Amsterdam city administration and they were sidelined during the vroedschap elections of February 1671.

Andries de Graeff was once again put forward as mayor and managed to gain control with his Republican faction. During the winter of 1671 it seemed as if – at least in Amsterdam – the Republicans were winning. It was an exceptionally opportune moment to commission a monumental ceiling painting on Amsterdam’s independent position for the ‘Sael’ of his mayor’s residence. De Graeff had a clear message in mind for the ceiling painting: the ‘Ware Vrijheid’ of the Republic was only protected by the Republican regents of Amsterdam. The paintings by Gerard de Lairesse glorify the de Graeff family’s role as the protector of the Republican state, defender of ‘Freedom’. The work of art can be viewed as a visual statement opposing the return of House of Orange.

In the Rampjaar 1672, when the Orangists took power again, de Graeff lost his position as one of the key States party figure together with his nephews Pieter and Jacob de Graeff and his brother-in-law Lambert Reynst. In that year, De Graeff was also attacked by the Amsterdam mob crowd at the Haarlemmerpoort.

Andries de Graeff died on 30 November 1678 in Amsterdam. His tomb chapel is to be found of at the Oude Kerk in Amsterdam.

Since his only son, Cornelis de Graeff, had already died in August of the same year, Andrie's death also ended the Imperial Knight branch of the De Graeff family in the male line.

Art and Lifestyle 
De Graeff surrounded himself with art and beauty. He was an art collector and patron of such artists and poets like Rembrandt van Rijn, who painted his portrait, Gerard ter Borch, Govaert Flinck, Artus Quellinus and Joost van den Vondel.

Van den Vondel wrote a book about De Graeffs descent and family, which was called Afbeeldingen der stamheeren en zommige telgen van de Graven, Boelensen, Bickeren en Witsens, toegewyt den edelen en gestrengen Heere Andries de Graeff, enz. met hunne portretten. Het vers Op den edelen en gestrengen Heer Andries de Graeff, Ouden Raet en Rekenmeester der Graeflijckheit van Hollant, en West-Vrieslant, nu Out-Burgermeester, en Zeeraedt  t'Amsterdam

At his City Palace in the Gouden Bocht ("Golden Bend"), the most prestigious part of Herengracht, he assembled a big art collection, including Jacob Blessing the Sons of Joseph of Rembrandt.

In 1674 Andries de Graeff owned 700.000 guilders. He was one of the richest persons from the Dutch Golden Age.

Notes

External links

 Biography I about Andries de Graeff at DBNL
 Biography II about Andries de Graeff at DBNL
 Biography about Andries de Graeff  Triumpf of Peace
 Biography by Pieter C. Vies: Andries de Graeff (1611-1678) `t Gezagh is heerelyk: doch vol bekommeringen
 Biography about Andries de Graeff at The Leiden collection

Literature
 Israel, Jonathan I. (1995) The Dutch Republic - Its Rise, Greatness, and Fall - 1477-1806, Clarendon Press, Oxford, 
 Zandvliet, Kees (2006) De 250 rijksten van de Gouden Eeuw: kapitaal, macht, familie en levensstijl blz. 93 t/m 94, uitg. Nieuw Amsterdam, Amsterdam, 
 Dudok van Heel, S.A.C.(1995) Op zoek naar Romulus & Remus. Een zeventiende-eeuws onderzoek naar de oudste magistraten van Amsterdam. Jaarboek Amstelodamum, p. 43-70.
 Burke, P. (1994) Venice and Amsterdam. A study of seventeenth-century élites.
 Graeff, P. de (P. de Graeff Gerritsz en Dirk de Graeff van Polsbroek) Genealogie van de familie De Graeff van Polsbroek, Amsterdam 1882.
 Bruijn, J. H. de Genealogie van het geslacht De Graeff van Polsbroek 1529/1827, met bijlagen. De  1962-63.

1611 births
1678 deaths
Nobility from Amsterdam
Dutch States Party politicians
Mayors of Amsterdam
Andries, Graeff de
History of Amsterdam
17th-century Dutch politicians
Lords of Urk
Lords of Emmeloord
Burials at the Oude Kerk, Amsterdam
University of Poitiers alumni
Imperial Knights